What Happens at The Abbey is an American reality television series that premiered on the E! cable network on May 14, 2017. The show follows the lives of the employees who work at the West Hollywood, California nightclub, The Abbey.

Cast
 David Cooley, the owner
 Brandon Winn, David's assistant
 Brandi Andrews, a VIP Host
 Lawrence Carroll, a VIP Host
 Murray Swanby, a VIP Host
 Cory Zwierzynski, a bartender
 Chelsea Jeffers, a management trainee
 Billy Reilich, a VIP server
 Ashlee Lian, Chelsea's friend
 Kim Senser, a server
 Elizabeth Steinle, a server
 Kyle Clarke, a bartender
 Marissa Chykirda, a new server
 Daniel Eid, a server

Production
A preview trailer for What Happens at The Abbey was released on March 28, 2017.

The show premiered on May 14, 2017.

During a live video on Instagram, on June 22, Lawrence announced that What Happens At The Abbey was not picked up for a second season.

Episodes

References

2017 American television series debuts
2017 American television series endings
2010s American reality television series
E! original programming
English-language television shows
Television shows set in Los Angeles
West Hollywood, California